Dustin is a town in Hughes County, Oklahoma, United States. The population was 395 at the 2010 census, down from 452 in 2000.

History
Dustin, Oklahoma was called Watsonville when the community first formed in the late 19th century. When the post office opened there on April 18, 1898, it was officially named as "Watsonville".

After the Fort Smith and Western Railroad built its Fort Smith–Guthrie line through the area in 1903, the town and post office were both officially changed to "Dustin" on May 9, 1904.

The Missouri, Oklahoma and Gulf Railway (MO&G), built a north–south line through Dustin in 1905.

Dustin became a trading and commercial center for the surrounding agricultural area. Early businesses included two banks, two drug stores, three doctors, and two hardware stores. Although a school was among the first buildings constructed, it burned down before the school year began. It was soon replaced and two male teachers were hired. The MO&G maintained a railroad round house for working on its locomotives. Before the end of the first decade, Dustin had added four barbershops, a third barbershop, a third drug store, a fourth doctor, a third bank, a livery stable, two hotels, two cotton gins, an ice plant/bottling plant, and a wagon factory. Several newspapers, including the Dustin Dispatch, the Dustin News, and the Dustonian, informed the citizens in the early decades of the twentieth century.

Dustin built its first water supply system in 1912. In the 1930s, the community built Lake Dustin, a community-owned spring-fed  reservoir. In 2012, Dustin began constructing a new municipal water supply system in 2003. The 1910 census reported that Dustin had a population of 579, which increased to an all-time high of 713 in 1920.

Geography
Dustin is located in northeastern Hughes County at  (35.272609, -96.032855). Oklahoma State Highway 9 passes through the center of town, leading east  to the Indian Nation Turnpike and west  to Wetumka. Oklahoma State Highway 84 departs OK-9 in the center of Dustin, leading north and west  to Weleetka.

Fish Creek flows through the southeast corner of the town, running northeast to the North Canadian River.

Demographics

As of the census of 2000, there were 452 people, 164 households, and 120 families residing in the town. There were 186 housing units at an average density of 309.9 per square mile (119.7/km2). The racial makeup of the town was 53.76% White, 0.44% African American, 34.29% Native American, 0.22% Pacific Islander, 0.44% from other races, and 10.84% from two or more races. Hispanic or Latino of any race were 1.99% of the population.

There were 164 households, 31.1% had children under the age of 18 living with them, 54.3% were married couples living together, 12.8% had a female householder with no husband present, and 26.8% were non-families. A total of 25.6% of all households were made up of individuals, and 12.2% had someone living alone who was 65 years of age or older. The average household size was 2.76 and the average family size was 3.34.

The population distribution for the town was 28.1% under the age of 18, 7.5% from 18 to 24, 26.1% from 25 to 44, 22.1% from 45 to 64, and 16.2% who were 65 years of age or older. The median age of the residents was 38 years old. For every 100 females, there were 97.4 males. For every 100 females age 18 and over, there were 99.4 males.

The median income for a household in the town was $20,625, and the median income for a family was $24,375. Males had a median income of $24,167 versus $19,063 for females. The per capita income for the town was $8,767. About 28.3% of the families and 35.9% of the population were below the poverty line, including 38.9% of those under age 18 and 34.6% of those age 65 or over.

Notable person
Phyllis Fife, painter, born near Dustin in 1948

Notes
Dustin is not a Native American word.

Spokogee, Es•po•ko•ke Old name for the Tukahahchee (Tribe) [thought to be a loan word from Shawnee]

See also
Brooks–McFarland feud

References

External links
 Encyclopedia of Oklahoma History and Culture - Dustin

Towns in Hughes County, Oklahoma
Towns in Oklahoma